AQA, formerly the Assessment and Qualifications Alliance, is an awarding body in England, Wales and Northern Ireland. It compiles specifications and holds examinations in various subjects at GCSE, AS and A Level and offers vocational qualifications. AQA is a registered charity and independent of the government.  However, its qualifications and exam syllabi are regulated by the Government of the United Kingdom, which is the regulator for the public examinations system in England and Wales.

AQA is one of five awarding bodies which are recognised by schools across the country. AQA is also recognised by the regulators of the public exams systems for England, Wales and Northern Ireland to offer GCSE, AS and A Levels in the United Kingdom. AQA also offers the AQA Baccalaureate, a qualification also intended for students in Year 12 and 13 and which includes the study of three A-Levels, an extended project and extra-curricular enrichment activities. AQA is the largest examination board for GCSEs and GCE A Levels in England.

The organisation has several regional offices, the largest being in London, Guildford and Manchester.

Due to the growing number of students taking GCSE and A Level exams, AQA has introduced computerized and digital marking in addition to traditional marking of examinations in order to increase efficiency and accuracy of the examination correction.

History
AQA was originally formed on 7 November 1997 as an alliance of NEAB and AEB/SEG exam boards and City & Guilds vocational awarding body. NEAB and AEB/SEG formally merged on 1 April 2000. City & Guilds chose to remain independent of the new organisation, but transferred its GNVQ provision to AQA.

AQA holds the candidate records and awards for the following historic exam boards:

 Associated Examining Board (AEB) 
 Associated Lancashire Schools Examinations Board (ALSEB)
 Joint Matriculation Board (JMB)
 Northern Examining Association (NEA) 
 Northern Examinations and Assessment Board (NEAB)
 North Regional Examinations Board (NREB)
 North West Regional Examinations Board (NWREB)
 North West Secondary Schools Examinations Board (NWSSEB)
 Southern Examining Group (SEG)
 South Eastern Regional Examinations (SEREB)
  University of Bristol School Examinations Council (UBSEC)
 South West Regional Examinations Board (SWREB) 
 Yorkshire and Humberside Regional Examinations Board (YHREB)
 Yorkshire Regional Examinations Board (YREB) 
 The West Yorkshire and Lindsey Regional Examinations Board (TWYLREB)

Examination reform
The Conservative Party under Prime Minister David Cameron initiated reforms for A Levels to change from a modular structure to a linear one. British examination boards (Edexcel, AQA, OCR and WJEC) regulated and accredited by the Government of the United Kingdom responded to the government's reform announcements by modifying syllabi of several A Level subjects. However, the Labour Party and in particular the Member of Parliament Tristram Hunt announced that it would seek to halt and reverse the reforms and maintain the modular A-Level system. Labour's policy, and the modular AS- and A-Level system, are supported and promoted by the University of Cambridge and by the University of Oxford.

The organisation announced that it will begin offering courses for which all assessment is carried out through examinations at the end of the course. This is commonly referred to as a linear course. Beforehand, they offered modular courses in England with several exams. If a candidate is caught cheating during either the mock exams or the real exams, they will be put on a redlist. The redlist means that the specific candidate will have an invigilator standing beside them for the duration of exams. If the candidate is caught trying to cheat again or make communication with others they will be disqualified. To get off the redlist, said candidate will need to write a formal letter to the exam board apologising for their actions.

Controversies
During the summer 2022 exam series, AQA came under heavy criticism after several of its exam papers contained topics not included in the subject specific 'advance information'. Following an announcement from the exams regulator Ofqual in December 2021, exam boards were required to produce advance information, covering the 'focus' of exams, to alleviate the disruption experienced by pupils during the COVID-19 pandemic.

In June 2022, GCSE Physics Higher Paper One contained a 9-mark question on energy transfers and circuits. Advance Information had listed "series and parallel circuits" as a topic "not assessed" in the paper. Following the error, AQA announced that full marks would be awarded for the offending question, guaranteeing nine marks for each pupil who sat the paper. In addition, AQA announced that it would be performing "extra checks on the advance information and question papers for future exams".

In relation to the June 2022 A Level Physics Paper Two, claims were made that advance information provided to pupils misleadingly stated that questions relating to Electric Fields and Capacitance would only be present synoptically and in low tariff questions; these topics made up the third question of the paper, worth 12 marks, and came up 8 times in the multiple choice section, in total these topics made up 23.5% of the 85 mark paper. The perceived error lead to significant backlash on social media. AQA responded by defending the paper, stating that the two topics were separate and therefore "neither carried enough marks to be included in the advance information list".

On 17 June 2022, AQA apologised after A-level Law Paper Two contained a 30 mark question on Rylands v Fletcher and Private nuisance, accounting for 30% of the 100 mark paper, which had not been included in the advance information. In response, AQA stated that it would "look at how students performed" after the paper had been marked and that it would "take any action necessary to protect [pupils]."

On 17 June 2022, exams regulator Ofqual criticised AQA and other exam boards for the 'distress' which mistakes on the advance information had caused pupils.

Shortly following the AQA A-Level Chemistry paper 2 (sat on the morning of 20 June 2022) photographs surfaced on social media, namely Twitter, showing the paper had been leaked potentially up to 7 days before it took place. Throughout the day that followed, AQA were reluctant to comment on the matter. This revelation was met with frustration and disbelief from students, teachers, and parents.

Chief executives
The Chief Executive of AQA runs the organisation on a day-to-day basis, while being accountable to the AQA Council. The role was known as the Director General from its introduction in April 1998 until July 2010.

 Kathleen Tattersall OBE, 1 April 1998 – 30 September 2003
 Mike Cresswell CBE, 1 October 2003 – 31 March 2010
 Andrew Hall, 4 June 2010 – 31 August 2017
 Toby Salt, 1 September 2017 – 8 September 2019
 Mark Bedlow, 9 September 2019 – 31 August 2020 (interim chief executive)
 Colin Hughes, 1 September 2020–

See also
AQA Anthology

References

External links 

Examination boards in the United Kingdom